William D. Evans (born February 8, 1958) is an American jazz saxophonist, who was a member of the Miles Davis group in the 1980s and has since led several of his own bands, including Push and Soulgrass. Evans plays tenor and soprano saxophones. He has recorded over 17 solo albums and received two Grammy Award nominations. He recorded an award-winning album called Bill Evans – Vans Joint with the WDR Big Band in 2009.

He has played a variety of music with his solo projects, including bluegrass, jazz, and funk. His style is influenced by Michael Brecker, Bob Berg, Sonny Rollins, Joe Henderson, John Coltrane, Stan Getz, Steve Grossman, and Dave Liebman.

Biography
Evans was born in Clarendon Hills, Illinois, United States. His father was a classical piano prodigy and until junior high school Evans studied classical clarinet. He attended Hinsdale Central High School and studied with tenor saxophonist Vince Micko. Early in his studies he was able to hear such artists as Sonny Stitt and Stan Getz at the Jazz Showcase in Chicago.

Evans attended University of North Texas and William Paterson University, where he studied with Dave Liebman, an alumnus of trumpeter Miles Davis's early 1970s bands. Moving to New York city in 1979, he spent countless hours in lofts playing jazz standards and perfecting his improvisational style.

At the age of 22, he joined Miles Davis and was part of his comeback in the early to mid–1980s. Notable albums recorded with Davis include The Man With The Horn, We Want Miles, Star People, and Decoy. Evans is unrelated to pianist Bill Evans (1929–1980), who played with Davis in the 1950s.

He has played, toured and recorded with artists such as Herbie Hancock, John McLaughlin, Michael Franks, Willie Nelson, Mick Jagger, Les McCann, Mark Egan, Danny Gottlieb, Ian Anderson, Randy Brecker, The Allman Brothers Band, and Medeski Martin & Wood. He is featured on the Petite Blonde album with Victor Bailey, Dennis Chambers, Mitch Forman, and Chuck Loeb.

During the 1980s and 1990s, Evans was a member of the group Elements. He joined the reformed Mahavishnu Orchestra in 1984 and performed with them until they broke up in 1987. Beginning in 1990 he toured with his own band.

Two of his albums, Soul Insider and Soulgrass, were nominated for a Grammy Award. Soulgrass was combination of bluegrass and jazz fusion that featured Béla Fleck, Sam Bush, Bruce Hornsby, and Vinnie Colaiuta.

Discography

As leader 

Co-leader with Hank Jones, Red Mitchell
 Moods Unlimited  (Paddle Wheel, 1983) – rec. 1982

Co-leader with Randy Brecker, Robben Ford and Tom Scott
 Echoes of Ellington Vol. 1 (Verve, 1987)
 Echoes of Ellington Vol. 2 (Verve, 1988)

Co-leader with Victor Bailey, Dennis Chambers, Mitch Forman and Chuck Loeb
 Petite Blonde (Lipstick, 1992) – live

Co-leader with Andy LaVerne, John Patitucci and Steve Davis
 Modern Days and Nights: Music of Cole Porter  (Double-Time, 1997)

Co-leader with Dave Weckl, Mark Egan and WDR Big Band Cologne
 Vans Joint (BHM, 2008)

Co-leader with Robben Ford
 The Sun Room (Ear, 2019)
 Common Ground (13J Productions, 2020)

As a member 
Elements
 Elements (Philo, 1982)
 Forward Motion (Antilles, 1984)
 Blown Away (Passport, 1986)
 Illumination (Novus, 1988)
 Liberal Arts (RCA, 1989)
 Spirit River (RCA, 1990)

Steps Ahead
 Steppin' Out with WDR Big Band (Jazzline, 2016)

As sideman 
With Victor Bailey
 Bottom's Up (Atlantic, 1989)
 Low Blow (ESC, 1999)
 That's Right (ESC, 2001)

With Miles Davis
 The Man with the Horn (Columbia, 1981)
 We Want Miles (Columbia, 1982)
 Star People (Columbia, 1983)
 Decoy (Columbia, 1984)

With Mark Egan
 A Touch of Light (GRP, 1988)
 Beyond Words (Bluemoon, 1991)
 Freedom Town (Wavetone, 2001)
 Truth Be Told (Wavetone, 2010)

With Michael Franks
 Skin Dive (Warner Bros., 1985)
 The Camera Never Lies (Warner Bros., 1987)

With Jeff Golub
 Unspoken Words (Gaia, 1988)
 Avenue Blue Featuring Jeff Golub (Bluemoon, 1994)
 Nightlife (Bluemoon, 1997)

With Danny Gottlieb
 Aquamarine (Atlantic, 1987)
 Whirlwind (Atlantic, 1989)

With Chuck Loeb
 Life Colors (DMP, 1990)
 Mediterranean (DMP, 1993)

With Leslie Mándoki
 People in Room No. 8 (PolyGram, 1997)
 Out of Key with the Time (Sony, 2002)
 Soulmates (Paroli, 2002)
 Aquarelle (Neo, 2009)

With Lee Ritenour
 Alive in L.A. (GRP, 1997)
 This Is Love (i.e. Music 1998)

With Aziza Mustafa Zadeh
 Dance of Fire (Columbia, 1995)
 Inspiration (Columbia, 2000)

With others
 Andy Summers, Charming Snakes (Private Music, 1990)
 Gianfranco Continenza, The Past Inside The Present (ESC, 2007)

References

External links

 Official site

1958 births
Living people
People from Clarendon Hills, Illinois
21st-century American saxophonists
American jazz tenor saxophonists
American male saxophonists
American people of Welsh descent
Jazz musicians from Illinois
Jazz tenor saxophonists
American male jazz musicians
Elements (band) members
Mahavishnu Orchestra members
Steps Ahead members
Double-Time Records artists
Elektra Records artists
Blue Note Records artists
21st-century American male musicians